Berlin Packaging is the world’s largest Hybrid Packaging Supplier® of glass, plastic, and metal containers and closures. The company supplies billions of items annually along with package design & innovation, global sourcing, warehousing & logistics, quality advocacy, financing & consulting, and sustainability services for customers across all industries. Berlin Packaging brings together the best of manufacturing, distribution, and income-adding service providers. Its mission is to increase the net income of its customers through packaging products and services. 

With headquarters in Chicago, IL (North America) and Milan (EMEA), the company has over 2,200 employees across 130+ sales offices and warehouses throughout the world with locations in the United States, Canada, Italy, France, Spain, Germany, the Netherlands, Greece, Denmark, UK, Albania, Bulgaria, Romania, South Africa, and China.

History

Founding 
Berlin Packaging was formed in 1988 with the purchase of Alco Packaging, a longtime Chicago-based container company, which was renamed Berlin Packaging. Alco Packaging earned $69 million in annual sales at the time, and its roots trace back to 1898, when Riekes Container was founded, a firm purchased by Alco Packaging in 1975.

Acquisitions 

 In 2000, Berlin Packaging acquired Knap-Pac Containers, a wholesale provider of industrial and personal care packaging.
 In 2003, it purchased Freund Container, a packaging, closure and industrial-supplies distributor, maintaining it as an operating division.
 In 2010, the firm acquired two companies: All-Pak Inc. of Bridgeville, Pennsylvania, a supplier of rigid packaging products and services, and Continental Packaging Solutions, a multinational supplier of glass and plastic containers and closures headquartered in Chicago. Both companies were merged into Berlin Packaging's larger packaging business.
 In 2012, Berlin Packaging acquired two more companies: Lerman Container, a Connecticut-based packaging supplier, and United States Container Corporation, a California-based packaging distributor focused on industrial applications. Again, both companies were merged into Berlin Packaging's overall enterprise.
 In 2015, the company made another two acquisitions: Vivid Packaging, a Cleveland-based packaging supplier, and Diablo Valley Packaging, a $125 million supplier with an emphasis on glass packaging.
 In 2016, Berlin Packaging acquired Bruni Glass, a leading manufacturer of premium and specialty glass packaging for the spirits, wine, food, and gourmet markets. At the time, Bruni had sales of $150 million across 7,000 customers and 100 countries. This acquisition significantly expanded Berlin Packaging's presence in Europe as well as added locations in Canada, the United States and China.
 In 2018, Berlin Packaging extended its European presence with the acquisition of England-based H. Erben Ltd., a supplier of closures, packaging, and packaging equipment to the food and drink sectors. H. Erben Ltd. also brought locations in South Africa and California. The company was re-branded as Bruni Erben, a Berlin Packaging Company.
 In April 2019, Berlin Packaging continued to extend its European presence with the acquisition of Verrerie Calvet, a packaging supplier strategically located in Aimargues, France, the heart of Southern France’s food region. Verrerie Calvet brought experience in packaging for wine, spirits, olive oil, and gourmet seasonings, marinades and sauces.
 In September 2019, Berlin Packaging acquired Vincap B.V. and Adolfse Packaging B.V. (jointly, Vincap & Adolfse), an important packaging supplier strategically located in Utrecht, Netherlands.
 In September 2019, Berlin Packaging also announced the acquisition of Vetroservice Srl, a packaging supplier strategically located in the heart of central Italy's food and olive oil region.
 In October 2019,  Berlin Packaging announced the acquisition of Vidrimon, a premier supplier of olive oil bottles and innovative glass packaging for Southern Europe.
 In October 2019, Berlin Packaging also acquired Netherlands based Novio Packaging Group B.V. This strategic transaction significantly strengthened Berlin Packaging’s European plastic offering, enhanced its expertise in personal care, pharmaceutical, food, and sports nutrition verticals, and expanded its northern European footprint.
 In October 2020, Berlin Packaging announced  the acquisition of Vinkova B.V., a Netherlands-based glass packaging supplier with expertise in food and beverage verticals. This strategic transaction, which marked Berlin’s eighth acquisition in Europe since 2016, strengthens the company’s glass offering in northern Europe.
 In November 2020, Berlin Packaging announced the acquisition of Consolidated Bottle Corporation, a leading packaging supplier in Canada. The transaction significantly expanded Berlin Packaging’s footprint in Canada.
 In December 2020, Berlin Packaging announced the purchase of Repli and Penta Packaging, two leading companies in plastic packaging. Repli, based in Barcelona, Spain, and Penta Packaging, based in Bergamo, Italy, significantly expanded Berlin Packaging's product portfolio to several key end markets, including industrial, specialty chemicals, food and beverage, food care. household, cosmetic and pharmaceutical.
 In December 2020, Berlin Packaging also announced the acquisition of Newpack, a leading glass packaging company based in Savona, Italy. Newpack was Berlin Packaging's tenth European acquisition since 2016.
 In February 2021, Berlin Packaging announced the acquisitions of Sodis-Uhart and Audoubert, two historic companies operating in the glass and metal packaging markets in the South of France.
 In March 2021, Berlin Packaging announced the acquisition of Roma International, a historical company based in England, which provided better geographic coverage in the Cosmetics and Personal Care segment. By joining Berlin Packaging, Roma International further expanded Berlin's capacity to cover the cosmetics and personal care market in Northern Europe in addition to the Group's global presence.
 In March 2021, Berlin Packaging also announced the acquisition of Glass Line, a Savona, Italy based supplier of glass and metal packaging specializing in the food and beverage end-markets.
 In April 2021, Berlin Packaging announced the acquisition of Raepak. The addition of Raepak strengthened Berlin's operations in the cosmetics and personal care markets in the United Kingdom.
 In June 2021, Berlin Packaging announced the acquisition of Elias Valavanis S.A. to the Berlin Packaging Family, the company's 15th acquisition in Europe. The addition of Elias Valavanis expanded Berlin's global footprint to include the Balkans and strengthened existing business in the Mediterranean.
 In June 2021, Berlin Packaging also announced the acquisition of Cannasupplies. This acquisition added significant expertise in the Canadian cannabis end-market and allows Berlin to better serve customers by expanding cannabis packaging product offering.
 In August 2021, Berlin Packaging announced the acquisition of Juvasa Group. The addition of Juvasa Group expanded Berlin's global footprint in Iberia and the Canary Islands and brought new design and e-commerce capabilities.
 In December 2021, the Berlin Packaging acquired the French wine bottle manufacturer Gerfran SAS.
 In January 2022, Berlin Packaging announced the acquisition of Le Parfait, a French company known for their iconic glass jars. The acquisition strengthened Berlin Packaging’s position as a leading supplier of high-quality glass containers in the business-to-business (B2B) market while simultaneously gaining share in the business-to-consumer (B2C) market.
 In January 2022, Berlin Packaging announced the acquisition of Premi S.p.A., a Milan-based company specializing in the supply of packaging products for the beauty and cosmetic industry.
 In March 2022, Berlin Packaging announced the acquisition of United Bottles & Packaging, a Canadian-based distributor of high-quality glass bottles and closures for the food and beverage end markets.
 In April 2022, Berlin Packaging announced the acquisition of Panvetri, a family-owned supplier of glass and metal packaging for the wine and olive oil industries.
 In June 2022, Berlin Packaging announced the acquisition of Verrerie du Comtat,  a supplier of glass packaging for the French wine and olive oil end markets.
 In June 2022, Berlin Packaging also announced the acquisition of Andler Packaging, a leading plastic, glass, and metal packaging product distributor.
 In June 2022, Berlin Packaging also announced the acquisition of Vidrierías Pérez Campos SL, a family-owned Spanish distributor of glass packaging for the olive oil, home fragrance, and spirits markets. This was Berlin Packaging's 5th global acquisition of 2022.
 In July 2022, Berlin Packaging acquired Jansy, a provider of turnkey packaging solutions for the health and beauty industry. 
 In September 2022, Berlin Packaging acquired two companies, European Packaging Solutions (EPS), a family-owned distributor of glass packaging solutions with locations in Albania and Bulgaria, and Styleglass, a company based in Greece specializing in the decoration of glass packaging for the food, beverage, beauty, and pharmaceutical end markets.
 In October 2022, Berlin Packaging acquired two companies, DiscoGlass, a leading supplier in the high-end spirits industry with a strong reputation in Cognac and Bark Packaging Group a supplier of industrial, flexible, and UN-certified packaging.  With the acquisition of Bark, Berlin Packaging also welcomed DeeDee Pouch Professionals, a supplier of sustainable and innovative pouch solutions and other flexible products to the European food and chemical markets.

Milestones 
In 1989, the firm established its Global Packaging Group, followed a year later by the formation of E3, a consulting subsidiary. The company announced its Berlin Financial Services subsidiary in 1991 and opened its Studio One Eleven package design and innovation studio in 1999. In 2014, the firm's Quality Division began offering consulting services.

In 2007, Investcorp, a global asset management firm, acquired a majority ownership interest in Berlin Packaging. In 2014, Investcorp sold the corporation to Oak Hill Capital Partners, which acquired a majority stake. The transaction valued Berlin Packaging at $1.43 billion.

In April 2020, Berlin Packaging named William J. Hayes Chief Executive Officer and President. Previously Bill Hayes served as CEO at BrandSafway.

Structure

Product Lines 
Berlin Packaging designs, sources, inventories, and distributes stock and custom packaging, closures, dispensing systems, labels, shrink bands and other products. Its container lines include plastic bottles and jars, glass bottles and jars, metal cans and tins, pails and drums. Child-resistant, tamper-evident, and non-dispensing container caps are leading products in its closures line, while its dispensing systems include household and industrial trigger sprayers, lotion and treatment pumps, fine mist sprayers and foamer systems.

The company supplies packaging to all end-markets, including food, beverage, wine, spirits, beer, pharmaceutical, cannabis, personal care, home care, auto care, and industrial packaging.

Operations 
Berlin Packaging's award-winning design and innovation division, Studio One Eleven, has state-of-the-art design studios across the world with locations in the USA: Chicago, IL and Huntington Beach, CA and across Europe: Italy (Milan and Trezzano), Spain (Sevilla), Netherlands (Eerbeek & Wijchen), and the UK (Hadleigh). 

The company's operations are based on a PeopleSoft suite by Oracle. The system was installed in 2001, and Berlin received awards in 2006 and 2007 from CIO Magazine for their creative use of the tools. The company has upgraded the software numerous times, with the most recent major upgrade in 2012.

In 2004, it became the first company in its sector to be ISO 9001 certified. It was re-certified to the ISO 9001:2008 standard in 2010. It also maintains Customs-Trade Partnership Against Terrorism (C-TPAT) certification.

The company regularly reports its on-time delivery performance of its packaging shipments.

Berlin Packaging was profiled in The Human Equation, by Jeffrey Pfeffer, a Professor of Organizational Behavior at the Stanford Graduate School of Business. Pfeffer described its corporate culture as being particularly effective at recognizing the value of people and aligning management processes with business strategy.

Ownership
In October 2014, investment manager Investcorp completed the sale of Berlin Packaging to Oak Hill Capital Partners for $1.43 billion.

References

External links
US Berlin Packaging official website
 EU Berlin Packaging official website

Packaging companies of the United States
Companies based in Chicago